Jacqueline Yvonne Harry (born August 14, 1956) is an American actress, comedian, and television personality. She is known for her starring roles as Sandra Clark, the nemesis of Mary Jenkins (played by Marla Gibbs), on the NBC TV series 227 (1985–1990), and as Lisa Landry on the ABC/The WB sitcom Sister, Sister (1994–1999). She is noted for being the first African-American to win a Primetime Emmy Award for Outstanding Supporting Actress in a Comedy Series. 

She also starred in the 1992 film Ladybugs, opposite Rodney Dangerfield. Since March 2021, she has played Paulina Price on the NBC soap opera, Days of Our Lives.

Biography

Early life and education
Harry was born in Winston-Salem, North Carolina, in 1956 to an Afro-Trinidadian mother and African American father and raised in Harlem, New York. She began studying acting at the High School of the Performing Arts in midtown Manhattan in New York City. Harry graduated from Long Island University with a Bachelor of Arts degree in education and worked as a teacher of American history at Brooklyn Technical High School for two years before beginning a career on the New York stage.

Career

Theater
In 1978, Harry made her Broadway debut in A Broadway Musical. Throughout the 1980s she starred in numerous productions both on and off Broadway and in national touring productions. In 1994, Harry made her return to the theater by starring as Billie Holiday in the play Lady Day at Emerson's Bar and Grill. Following that stage production, she fulfilled the role of "madam who runs a bordello" in the Broadway musical The Boys from Syracuse. In the mid 2000s, she appeared in stage productions of The Sunshine Boys, Damn Yankees, and A Christmas Carol. She also toured nationally in JD Lawrence's The Clean Up Woman.

Television
 Harry made her television acting debut in 1983 on Another World as Lily Mason, a role she continued until 1986. In 1984, she made her motion pictures debuts with bit parts in Moscow on the Hudson and The Cotton Club.  In 1985, Harry began a co-starring role as Sandra Clark on the NBC sitcom 227. Her mother, Flossie, celebrated her getting the role but died before the show started airing. During the series' run, Harry and Marla Gibbs began feuding privately over who was the series' lead. They have since reconciled and collaborated on a number of projects. Her performance on 227 inspired NBC producers to create a television pilot for her entitled Jackée. Although the pilot episode was a success with audiences, the series did not last and the episode is now shown as an episode of 227.

After leaving 227 in 1989, Harry starred opposite Oprah Winfrey in The Women of Brewster Place, an adaptation of Gloria Naylor's novel of the same name. In 1990, she headlined an NBC comedy pilot from Witt/Thomas titled We'll Take Manhattan; it aired as a summer special that year, but did not make it to series. In late 1991, she joined the cast of The Royal Family after the star, Redd Foxx, unexpectedly died. She starred opposite two-time 227 guest-star Della Reese, but the series faltered in the ratings and was not renewed for a second season. In 1992, she starred as the assistant coach in Ladybugs. Harry served as a guest panelist on the 2000 revival of To Tell the Truth and appeared on the second season of VH1's Celebrity Fit Club 2 in 2005. From 1994 until 1999, Harry played Lisa Landry, the adoptive mother of Tia Mowry's character, on the sitcom Sister, Sister.

She had a recurring role as Vanessa on the UPN/The CW series Everybody Hates Chris and had a recurring role on the BET Series Let's Stay Together. From 2012 to 2015, she starred in Byron Allen's sitcom The First Family. In 2013, she appeared in the pilot episode of the Disney sitcom Girl Meets World, as well as the episodes "Girl Meets Crazy Hat" and "Girl Meets Demolition". That same year, she also joined Gibbs in the movie Forbidden Woman. In 2014, she made a guest appearance on Instant Mom as her character Lisa Landry. She appeared in the 2 Broke Girls episode "And the Sax Problem" in 2016, as Earl's (Garrett Morris) ex-girlfriend.

On December 8, 2020, during an appearance on Today, Harry announced that she was set to join the cast of the soap opera Days of Our Lives. Harry was cast as Paulina Price, the aunt of established character Lani Price-Grant (Sal Stowers). When the series was renewed for two additional seasons in 2021, Harry was placed on contract with the series. On July 25, 2021, she appeared on Celebrity Family Feud.

Personal life
Harry has one child and was once married to arranger and conductor Jerry Jemmott. In 1996, Harry married Elgin Charles Williams; they later divorced in 2003. During their marriage, Harry and Williams adopted a son, Frank, in 1997.

Filmography

Film/Movie

Television

Awards and nominations

References

External links
 
 
 
 
 

1956 births
20th-century American actresses
21st-century American actresses
Actresses from North Carolina
American people of Trinidad and Tobago descent
African-American actresses
African-American television directors
American musical theatre actresses
American soap opera actresses
American television actresses
American television directors
American women comedians
American women television directors
LIU Post alumni
Outstanding Performance by a Supporting Actress in a Comedy Series Primetime Emmy Award winners
Living people
Participants in American reality television series
Actors from Winston-Salem, North Carolina
Fiorello H. LaGuardia High School alumni
People from Harlem
20th-century African-American women singers
21st-century African-American women
21st-century African-American people